Fluxinella polita is a species of extremely small deep water sea snail, a marine gastropod mollusk in the family Seguenziidae.

Description
The length of the shell attains 4.1 mm.

Distribution
This marine species occurs off New Caledonia.

References

 Marshall B. A. 1991 — Mollusca Gastropoda: Seguenziidae from New Caledonia and the Loyalty Islands, in CROSNIER A & BOUCHET P. (eds) Résultats des Campagnes MUSORSTOM, Volume 7. Mémoires du Muséum national d’Histoire naturelle 150: 41-109.

External links
 To Encyclopedia of Life
 To USNM Invertebrate Zoology Mollusca Collection
 To World Register of Marine Species
 

polita
Gastropods described in 1991